The extensible NEXUS file format is widely used in bioinformatics. It stores information about taxa, morphological and molecular characters, distances, genetic codes, assumptions, sets, trees, etc. Several popular phylogenetic programs such as PAUP*, MrBayes, Mesquite, MacClade and SplitsTree use this format.

Syntax 
A NEXUS file is made out of a fixed header #NEXUS followed by multiple blocks. Each block starts with BEGIN block_name; and ends with END;. The keywords are case-insensitive. Comments are enclosed inside square brackets .

There are a few pre-defined block names for common types of data. Examples include:

TAXA block  The TAXA block contains information about taxa.
DATA block  The DATA block contains the data matrix (e.g. sequence alignment).
TREES block  The TREES block contains phylogenetic trees described using the Newick format, e.g. ((A,B),C);:

The following example uses the three block types above: 

 #NEXUS
 Begin TAXA;
   Dimensions ntax=4;
   TaxLabels SpaceDog SpaceCat SpaceOrc SpaceElf;
 End;
 
 Begin data;
   Dimensions nchar=15;
   Format datatype=dna missing=? gap=- matchchar=.;
   Matrix
     [ When a position is a "matchchar", it means that it is the same as the first entry at the same position. ]
     SpaceDog   
     SpaceCat   
     SpaceOrc    [ same as atgttagctag-tgg ]
     SpaceElf              
   ;
 End;
 
 BEGIN TREES;
   Tree tree1 = (((SpaceDog,SpaceCat),SpaceOrc,SpaceElf));
 END;

See also
Newick format
NeXML format
phyloXML
PAUP*

References

External links
NEXUS file format — detailed explanation with many examples
NEXUS format — a good description of the format and its uses in the field
Nexus to phyloXML converter
NeXML
Nexus to Fasta converter

Bioinformatics
Biological sequence format
Phylogenetics